Dolní Přím is a municipality and village in Hradec Králové District in the Hradec Králové Region of the Czech Republic. It has about 700 inhabitants.

Administrative parts

Villages of Horní Přím, Jehlice, Nový Přím and Probluz are administrative parts of Dolní Přím.

History
The first written mention of Dolní Přím is from 1378.

It was partly a site of the Battle of Königgrätz in 1866.

References

External links

Villages in Hradec Králové District